The 2018 St. Petersburg Open was a tennis tournament played on indoor hard courts. It was the 23rd edition of the St. Petersburg Open, and part of the ATP World Tour 250 Series of the 2018 ATP World Tour. It took place at the Sibur Arena in Saint Petersburg, Russia, from September 17 through 23, 2018.

Singles main-draw entrants

Seeds

 1 Rankings are as of September 10, 2018

Other entrants
The following players received wildcards into the singles main draw:
  Roberto Bautista Agut 
  Stan Wawrinka 
  Mikhail Youzhny

The following players received entry from the qualifying draw:
  Ilya Ivashka 
  Adrián Menéndez Maceiras
  Lucas Miedler
  Luca Vanni

The following player received entry as a lucky loser:
  Ruben Bemelmans

Withdrawals
Before the tournament
  Marcos Baghdatis → replaced by  Ruben Bemelmans
  Jozef Kovalík → replaced by  Marcos Baghdatis
  Leonardo Mayer → replaced by  Evgeny Donskoy

Doubles main-draw entrants

Seeds

 Rankings are as of September 10, 2018

Other entrants
The following pairs received wildcards into the doubles main draw:
   Mikhail Elgin /  Denis Istomin
   Teymuraz Gabashvili /  Evgeny Karlovskiy

Withdrawals
During the tournament
   Denis Istomin

Champions

Singles

  Dominic Thiem def.  Martin Kližan, 6–3, 6–1

Doubles

   Matteo Berrettini /  Fabio Fognini def.  Roman Jebavý /  Matwé Middelkoop, 7–6(8–6), 7–6(7–4)

References

External links
Official website

St. Petersburg Open
St Petersburg Open
St Petersburg Open
St. Petersburg Open